Julia Adolphe (born May 16, 1988 in New York City) is an American composer of contemporary classical music. Her works include choral, orchestral, operatic, chamber and art song pieces.

Her initial mainstream recognition was in November 2016 at the New York premiere of her viola concerto Unearth, Release, which was co-commissioned by the New York Philharmonic and the League of American Orchestras. Adolphe has a Bachelor of Arts from Cornell University and a Master of Music degree in music composition from USC and is pursuing her doctoral degree from the USC Thornton School of Music.

She is the niece of composer Bruce Adolphe.

Awards, prizes and grants

List of compositions

Opera

Orchestral

Choral

Chamber

Art song

References

External links
Official website

1988 births
Living people
21st-century classical composers
21st-century American composers
American classical composers
American women classical composers
Musicians from New York City
21st-century American women musicians
Cornell University alumni
USC Thornton School of Music alumni
Classical musicians from New York (state)
21st-century women composers